Xiang Lili (born September 1962) is a former Chinese politician who spent his entire career in his home-province Hunan.  As of May 2019 he was under investigation by China's top anti-corruption agency. Previously he served as vice-chairman of the Standing Committee of Hunan Provincial People's Congress. Prior to that, he was vice-governor of Hunan (2016-2018), secretary general of Hunan (2015-2016), mayor and party chief of Chenzhou (2008-2015), head of Hunan Provincial Commerce Department (2008-2008), and vice-mayor and executive vice-mayor of Changsha (1998-2007).

Education
Xiang was born in Hengdong County, Hunan, in September 1962. His father once served as magistrate of Hedong County. After the resumption of college entrance examination, in September 1979, he was accepted to Xiangtan University, where he majored in history.

Career
After graduating in July 1983, he was dispatched to the government of his home-county. In May 1986, he was transferred to Shenzhen, a newly established special economic zone, and appointed director of the Shenzhen Office of Hunan Provincial People's Government. In December 1988, he was transferred to Changsha, capital of Hunan province, and appointed secretary of Secretariat of General Office of CPC Hunan Provincial Committee. He was deputy party chief of Lengshuitan in July 1997, but having held the position for only two years. In September 1993, he was transferred to Changsha again and appointed secretary general of CPC Changsha Municipal Committee. After a year as party chief of the West District of Changsha, he was appointed party chief of newly established Yuelu District in July 1996. In June 1998 he became vice-mayor of Changsha, and then executive vice-mayor, in September 2006. In November 2007 he became the deputy head of Hunan Provincial Commerce Department, rising to the head position the next year. He served as deputy party chief of Chenzhou in August 2008, and three years later promoted to the party chief position. He became secretary general of Hunan in April 2015, and concurrently served as vice-governor in May 2016. He was vice-chairman of the Standing Committee of Hunan Provincial People's Congress in January 2018, a position he held for only a year.

Investigation
On May 17, 2019, he was put under investigation for alleged "serious violations of discipline and laws" by the Central Commission for Discipline Inspection (CCDI), the party's internal disciplinary body, and the National Supervisory Commission, the highest anti-corruption agency of China. He expelled from the Communist Party of China and removed from public office on 7 September. He was detained on 23 September. On June 12, 2020, the court found Xiang guilty on all counts, including consorting with some private enterprise owners and using his power and influence to seek benefits for them, trading power for money unscrupulously, accepting a huge amount of money and gifts, and sentenced him to 15 years in prison. The court also confiscated six million yuan of his personal assets and ordered him to hand in money gained from bribes.

Xiang had a long-term working relationship with Qin Guangrong beginning in 1991, sharing stints in Lingling and Changsha. Just a week before Xiang Lili's stepped down, Qin Guangrong, former party chief of Yunnan, turned himself in to the government and was placed under investigation.

Personal life
Xiang has a younger brother named Xiang Mingming, who is a businessman.

References

1968 births
Living people
People from Hengdong County
Xiangtan University alumni
Hunan University alumni
People's Republic of China politicians from Hunan
Chinese Communist Party politicians from Hunan